HMS Pretoria Castle (F61) was a Union-Castle ocean liner that in the Second World War was converted into a Royal Navy armed merchant cruiser, and then converted again into an escort carrier. After the war she was converted back into a passenger liner and renamed Warwick Castle.

History
Harland and Wolff built Pretoria Castle in Belfast, launching her in 1938 and completing her in April 1939. The Admiralty requisitioned her for the Royal Navy in October 1939, and had her converted into an armed merchant cruiser with eight  and two  guns, entering service in November 1939. In this role she served mainly in the South Atlantic.

In July 1942 the Admiralty bought her outright for conversion to an escort carrier by Swan Hunter on Tyneside. For her new role her armament included ten Oerlikon 20 mm cannon. She was commissioned in her new role in July 1943. She operated as a trials and training carrier, seeing no active combat service.

In 1945 she twice became part of aviation history, firstly when British test pilot Captain Eric "Winkle" Brown landed a Bell Airacobra Mk. 1 on her flight deck - the first carrier landing made using an aircraft with a  tricycle undercarriage, due to a declared emergency during initial trials for rubber deck landings planned for future carriers, and then by hosting the first ever landings and take-offs by a glider, performed by John Sproule in a Slingsby T.20 as part of research into "round-down" turbulence. On 11 August 1946, while moored on the Clyde, a Gloster Meteor was used for deck handling trials which later led to flight trials on other carriers.

After the war the ship was sold back to the Union-Castle Line in 1946 and converted back to a passenger liner, restored to its route between England and South Africa but renamed Warwick Castle. She was sold and scrapped in Barcelona in July 1962.

Notes

References

Further reading

External links

1938 ships
World War II Auxiliary cruisers of the Royal Navy
Escort carriers of the Royal Navy
Ocean liners
Passenger ships of the United Kingdom
Ships built in Belfast
Ships built by Harland and Wolff
Ships of the Union-Castle Line
World War II aircraft carriers of the United Kingdom